In classical electromagnetism, magnetization is the vector field that expresses the density of permanent or induced magnetic dipole moments in a magnetic material. Movement within this field is described by direction and is either Axial or Diametric. The origin of the magnetic moments responsible for magnetization can be either microscopic electric currents resulting from the motion of electrons in atoms, or the spin of the electrons or the nuclei. Net magnetization results from the response of a material to an external magnetic field.  Paramagnetic materials have a weak induced magnetization in a magnetic field, which disappears when the magnetic field is removed.  Ferromagnetic and ferrimagnetic materials have strong magnetization in a magnetic field, and can be magnetized to have magnetization in the absence of an external field, becoming a permanent magnet.  Magnetization is not necessarily uniform within a material, but may vary between different points. Magnetization also describes how a material responds to an applied magnetic field as well as the way the material changes the magnetic field, and can be used to calculate the forces that result from those interactions. It can be compared to electric polarization, which is the measure of the corresponding response of a material to an electric field in electrostatics. Physicists and engineers usually define magnetization as the quantity of magnetic moment per unit volume.
It is represented by a pseudovector M.

Definition
The magnetization field or M-field can be defined according to the following equation:

This is better illustrated through the following relation:

where m is an ordinary magnetic moment and the triple integral denotes integration over a volume. This makes the M-field completely analogous to the electric polarisation field, or P-field, used to determine the electric dipole moment p generated by a similar region or manifold with such a polarization:

Where  is the elementary electric dipole moment.

Those definitions of P and M as a "moments per unit volume" are widely adopted, though in some cases they can lead to ambiguities and paradoxes.

The M-field is measured in amperes per meter (A/m) in SI units.

In Maxwell's equations
The behavior of magnetic fields (B, H), electric fields (E, D), charge density (ρ), and current density (J) is described by Maxwell's equations. The role of the magnetization is described below.

Relations between B, H, and M

The magnetization defines the auxiliary magnetic field H as

 (SI units)

 (Gaussian units)

which is convenient for various calculations. The vacuum permeability μ0 is, by definition,  V·s/(A·m) (in SI units).

A relation between M and H exists in many materials. In diamagnets and paramagnets, the relation is usually linear:

where χ is called the volume magnetic susceptibility, and μ is called the magnetic permeability of the material. The magnetic potential energy per unit volume (i.e. magnetic energy density) of the paramagnet (or diamagnet) in the magnetic field is:

the negative gradient of which is the magnetic force on the paramagnet (or diamagnet) per unit volume (i.e. force density).

In diamagnets and paramagnets, usually , and therefore .

In ferromagnets there is no one-to-one correspondence between M and H because of magnetic hysteresis.

Magnetic polarization

Alternatively to the magnetization, one can define the magnetic polarization,  (often the symbol  is used, not to be confused with current density).

 (SI units).

This is by direct analogy to the electric polarization, .
The magnetic polarization thus differs from the magnetization by a factor of :

 (SI units).

Whereas magnetization is measured typically in amperes/meter, the magnetic polarization is measured in teslas.

Magnetization current

The magnetization M makes a contribution to the current density J, known as the magnetization current.

and for the bound surface current:

so that the total current density that enters Maxwell's equations is given by

where Jf is the electric current density of free charges (also called the free current), the second term is the contribution from the magnetization, and the last term is related to the electric polarization P.

Magnetostatics

In the absence of free electric currents and time-dependent effects, Maxwell's equations describing the magnetic quantities reduce to

These equations can be solved in analogy with electrostatic problems where

In this sense −∇⋅M plays the role of a fictitious "magnetic charge density" analogous to the electric charge density ρ; (see also demagnetizing field).

Dynamics

The time-dependent behavior of magnetization becomes important when considering nanoscale and nanosecond timescale magnetization. Rather than simply aligning with an applied field, the individual magnetic moments in a material begin to precess around the applied field and  come into alignment through relaxation as energy is transferred into the lattice.

Reversal 

Magnetization reversal, also known as switching, refers to the process that leads to a 180° (arc) re-orientation of the magnetization vector with respect to its initial direction, from one stable orientation to the opposite one. Technologically, this is one of the most important processes in magnetism that is linked to the magnetic data storage process such as used in modern hard disk drives. As it is known today, there are only a few possible ways to reverse the magnetization of a metallic magnet:
 an applied magnetic field
 spin injection via a beam of particles with spin
 magnetization reversal by circularly polarized light; i.e., incident electromagnetic radiation that is circularly polarized

Demagnetization

Demagnetization is the reduction or elimination of magnetization. One way to do this is to heat the object above its Curie temperature, where thermal fluctuations have enough energy to overcome exchange interactions, the source of ferromagnetic order, and destroy that order. Another way is to pull it out of an electric coil with alternating current running through it, giving rise to fields that oppose the magnetization.

One application of demagnetization is to eliminate unwanted magnetic fields. For example, magnetic fields can interfere with electronic devices such as cell phones or computers, and with machining by making cuttings cling to their parent.

See also

 Magnetometer
 Orbital magnetization

References

Electric and magnetic fields in matter